The inaugural 1967 Central American and Caribbean Championships in Athletics were held at the Estadio Heriberto Jara Corona in Xalapa, Veracruz, Mexico between 5–7 May.

Medal summary

Men's events

Women's events

A = affected by altitude

Medal table

External links
Men Results – GBR Athletics
Women Results – GBR Athletics

Central American and Caribbean Championships in Athletics
Central American and Caribbean Championships
A
Central American And Caribbean Championships In Athletics, 1967
International athletics competitions hosted by Mexico